U of S may refer to:

in Austria
 University of Salzburg

in Bulgaria
 University of Sofia, otherwise known as Sofia University

in Canada
 University of Saskatchewan

in the Philippines
 University of Silliman, otherwise known as Silliman University

in South Africa
 University of Stellenbosch, otherwise known as Stellenbosch University

in Sweden
 University of Stockholm, otherwise known as Stockholm University

in Thailand
 University of Silapakorn, otherwise known as Silpakorn University

in the United Kingdom
 University of Southampton, otherwise known as Southampton University
 University of Sussex, otherwise known as Sussex University

in the United States
 University of Seattle, otherwise known as Seattle University
 University of Seton Hall, otherwise known as Seton Hall University
 University of Shippensburg, otherwise known as Shippensburg University of Pennsylvania
 Sewanee, The University of the South
 South University
 University of Stanford, otherwise known as Stanford University
 University of Syracuse, otherwise known as Syracuse University
 University of Scranton

See also
 UdeS
 US (disambiguation)
 SU (disambiguation)